The 1999 Southwestern Bell Cotton Bowl Classic was a post-season college football game played on January 1, 1999. It pitted the Texas Longhorns against the Southeastern Conference (SEC) West champions Mississippi State Bulldogs. This was the first Cotton Bowl Classic broadcast by Fox.
 
This game was the first time Texas had reached the post-season since the 1996 season. It was the first bowl game for Texas under new head coach Mack Brown. Texas had compiled an 8–3 season record.
  
Meanwhile, Mississippi State had compiled an 8–3 regular season record under head coach Jackie Sherrill. They won the SEC West division title before falling to Tennessee, 24–14, in the SEC Championship game. The loss knocked them to 8–4 coming into the bowl game.

Behind the rushing of Ricky Williams, who was declared the Heisman Trophy and Doak Walker award winner a few days before, Texas raced to a 14–3 lead by halftime. They scored 24 unanswered points in the third quarter en route to a 38–11 victory.

It was Texas's first bowl game win since the 1994 Sun Bowl, and their first 9-win season as a Big 12 team (Texas had left the Southwest Conference and joined the Big 12 at the start of the 1996 season). It was also the first Cotton Bowl Classic on Fox.

References

External links
1999 Cotton Bowl Recap: Texas 38, Mississippi State 11
Cotton Bowl 1999

Cotton Bowl Classic
Cotton Bowl Classic
Texas Longhorns football bowl games
Mississippi State Bulldogs football bowl games
January 1999 sports events in the United States
1999 in sports in Texas
1990s in Dallas
1999 in Texas